Three ships of the United States Navy have been named USS Antietam, after the Battle of Antietam.

 , was a sailing sloop launched in 1864 and used as a stores ship.
 , was an aircraft carrier commissioned at the end of World War II, a combatant in the Korean War, and decommissioned in 1963.
 , is a guided missile cruiser commissioned in 1987, and currently on active service.

See also

 USCGC Antietam, later renamed , was a cutter which was commissioned from 1927 to 1944 before capsizing.

Sources
 

United States Navy ship names